The 2008 Men's Australian Hockey League was the 18th edition of the men's field hockey tournament. The tournament was held in Australia's capital city, Canberra.

The WA Thundersticks won the gold medal for the seventh time by defeating the QLD Blades 4–2 in the final.

Competition format
The tournament comprised a single round-robin format in the preliminary round. At the conclusion of the preliminary round, teams ranked first to fourth progressed to the medal round, while teams ranked fifth to eighth progressed to the classification round.

Teams

  Canberra Lakers
  Southern Hotshots

  NSW Waratahs
  Tassie Tigers

  NT Stingers
  VIC Vikings

  QLD Blades
  WA Thundersticks

Results

Preliminary round

Fixtures

Classification round

Fifth to eighth place classification

Crossover

Seventh and eighth place

Fifth and sixth place

First to fourth place classification

Semi-finals

Third and fourth place

Final

Awards

Statistics

Final standings

Goalscorers

References

External links

2008
2008 in Australian men's field hockey
Sports competitions in Canberra